Mjølner may refer to:

Mjölnir, Mjølner in Danish or Norwegian
FK Mjølner, football club from Narvik
HNoMS Mjølner (1868), a Norwegian naval vessel